Peter III may refer to:

Politics
 Peter III of Bulgaria (ruled in 1072)
 Peter III of Aragon (1239–1285)
 Peter III of Arborea (died 1347)
 Peter III Aaron (died 1467)
 Pedro III of Kongo (ruler in 1669)
 Peter III of Russia (1728–1762)
 Peter III of Portugal (1717–1786)
 Peter III (cat) (1947-1964)

Religion
 Pope Peter III of Alexandria (477–489)
 Peter III of Raqqa, Syriac Orthodox Patriarch of Antioch in 581–591
 Peter III (bishop of Lugo) (r. from 1113 until 1133)
 Peter III, Pope Peter III of the schismatic Palmarian Catholic Church

See also
Pedro III (disambiguation)